The position of Professor of Jurisprudence (originally the Corpus Professor of Jurisprudence) at the University of Oxford, England, was created in 1869.

The holders of the position have been:

 Sir Henry Maine 1869–77
 Sir Frederick Pollock 1883–1903
 Sir Paul Vinogradoff 1903–25
 Walter Ashburner 1926–1929
 Sir Carleton Allen 1929–1931
 Arthur Lehman Goodhart 1931–51
 H. L. A. Hart 1952–68
 Ronald Dworkin 1969–98
 John Gardner 2000–2016 
 Ruth Chang 2019–

References

Professorships at the University of Oxford
Professorships in law
Professorships in philosophy
1869 establishments in England
Lists of people associated with the University of Oxford